The Team Tango Tango 2 is an American low-wing composite homebuilt aircraft, marketed as a kit for amateur construction by Team Tango of Williston, Florida.

Design and development
The Tango 2 was developed from the 1983 Aero Mirage TC-2 design. The Tango 2 is a side-by-side two-seat composite aircraft that can be flying in as little as 1000 hours of build time. Current aircraft have been built with engines ranging from the 150 HP O-320 Lycoming to the Geared Drives 205 hp EcoTech 2.2 liter supercharged Cobalt SS power package, with the most popular the 180 hp IO-360 Lycoming. Cruise speeds run from 170 knots with the 150 hp/fixed pitch combo to 195 knots on a 200 hp Lycoming equipped with a constant speed prop. Both the fuselage and the main wing and horizontal spars are molded as single pieces for exceptional strength and ease of building. With the XR version it is possible to fly from coast to coast, non-stop, on a west-to-east route.

The design was further developed into a four-seat aircraft, the Team Tango Foxtrot.

Variants
Tango 2
Base model
Tango XR
Extended range aircraft with 90 gallon wet wing fuel tanks.

Specifications (Tango 2)

See also

References

External links

Homebuilt aircraft
Single-engined tractor aircraft
Team Tango aircraft
Low-wing aircraft
Aircraft first flown in 1996